In the Hindu epic Mahabharata, Lakshmana Kumara, also rendered Lakshmana is the son of Duryodhana and Bhanumati, and a grandson of Dhritarashtra and Gandhari. He is described to have a twin sister called Lakshmanā, who is kidnapped by Samba, a son of Krishna. He is slain on the thirteenth day of the Kurukshetra War by Abhimanyu, who decapitates him using an arrow.

Legend

Sasirekha Parinayam 
In a Telugu folktale called the Sasirekha Parinayam, Balarama arranged the marriage of his daughter Sasirekha, also called Vatsala, and Lakshmana Kumara. His younger brother, Krishna, however, wished to strengthen the ties of his family and that of Arjuna. In a ploy, he invited his sister, Subhadra, and her son, Abhimanyu, to his house while the wedding preparations of Sasikrekha and Lakshmana Kumara ensued. Abhimanyu and Sasirekha fell in love and subsequently eloped. This incident brought much shame to Balarama, and served to infuriate Duryodhana.

Mahabharata 
On the second day of the Kurukshetra War, a furious melee ensued between Lakshmana Kumara and Abhimanyu. When Abhimanyu was on the cusp of victory, Duryodhana rushed to his son's aid.

On the twelfth day of the war, Lakshmana Kumara killed Kshatradeva, the son of Shikhandi. 

On the thirteenth day of the war, Lakshmana Kumara was stationed near his father, fighting his foes with great prowess. When Abhimanyu approached Lakshmana Kumara, the former was assailed with arrows on his arms and chest. Enraged, Abhimanyu employed a broad-headed arrow, which beheaded Lakshmana Kumara. In retaliation, Duryodhana rallied a number of powerful Kaurava warriors to attack Abhimanyu simultaneously, resulting in the latter's death.

References

See also
 Karna
Abhimanyu
Yuyutsu

Characters in the Mahabharata